Celestus striatus is a species of lizard of the Diploglossidae family. It is possibly found in Jamaica.

References

Celestus
Reptiles described in 1839
Reptiles of Jamaica
Endemic fauna of Jamaica
Taxa named by John Edward Gray